Olavi Latsa (19 July 1929 – 4 March 1988) was a Finnish cross-country skier. He competed in the men's 30 kilometre event at the 1956 Winter Olympics.

Cross-country skiing results

Olympic Games

References

External links
 

1929 births
1988 deaths
People from Pitkyarantsky District
Finnish male cross-country skiers
Olympic cross-country skiers of Finland
Cross-country skiers at the 1956 Winter Olympics
20th-century Finnish people